Majorca or Mallorca is a Balearic Island, part of Spain, located in the Mediterranean.

Majorca and Mallorca may also refer to:

 Kingdom of Majorca (1231–1344), encompassing the Balearic Islands and parts of the Iberian peninsula
 Battle of Majorca (August 16–September 12, 1936), in the Spanish Civil War
 Majorca, Victoria, an Australian ghost town
 Majorca Building, building in Melbourne, Australia built 1928–1930
 Mallorca (Vino de la Tierra), a wine from Majorca
 Mallorca cheese
 RCD Mallorca, a football team from the island
 Bàsquet Mallorca, a former basketball team from the island
 Operation Mallorca a United States Drug Enforcement Administration investigation
 Mallorca (Albéniz), a composition by Isaac Albéniz
 Mallorca – Suche nach dem Paradies or Mallorca, a 1999–2000 German soap opera
 Anisado Mallorca, or simply "Mallorca", a variant of anise liqueur from the Philippines

See also
Dog breeds
 Majorca Mastiff
 Majorca Ratter
 Majorca Shepherd Dog